is a 2014 film about the Hakkōda Mountains incident. It is based on the non-fiction book Tragedy in a Blizzard by Koshu Ogasawara.

Cast
 Atsushi Takahashi as Lt.Colonel Tsugawa
 Seiji Kawada as Major Yamaguchi
 Takahito Arai as Captain Kannari
 Akinori Sumiyoshi as Lieutenant Ito
 Katsuhiko Tanabe as Second Lieutenant Mikami
 Taichi Ishida as Medical Officer Nagai
 Yuma Sato as Corporal Obara
 Yuta Moriya as Corporal Fusanosuke Goto
 Makoto Sasaki as Corporal Muramatsu
 Toshiya Toya as Corporal Oikawa
 Hitoshi Hasegawa as Village Elder
 Amy Kubo as Sachiyo Goto (Cpl Goto's wife)

Production
The scenes in which the 5th Infantry Regiment gradually lose their way were filmed on location in the Hakkōda Mountains. Most of the victims died at Narusawa on January 25, their second day bivouacking in the snow. Scenes set there were shot on site at exactly the same day and time, and the entire cast and crew offered a silent prayer for the victims.

See also
 Mount Hakkoda (1977 film), an earlier film about the same incident

References

External links
 

2014 films
2010s Japanese-language films
Japanese drama films
Italian drama films
Mountaineering films
Films shot in Japan
Films set in 1902
Disaster films based on actual events
2010s English-language films
2010s Japanese films